John Alexander Hope Johnston (10 July 1871 – 5 June 1938) was a British educator. 

He taught at the Royal Agricultural College, Cirencester, Tonbridge School, and Highgate School, where he was headmaster for 28 years and was an early promoter of the study of the science of aeronautics.

Early life
The elder son of Major Alexander Kenneth Hope Johnston, a British Army officer, and his wife Lydia Lutener, Johnston was born at Aldershot and educated in Valetta, Malta, at Edinburgh University, where he graduated MA in mathematics and natural philosophy, and then finally at Pembroke College, Cambridge, graduating BA in 1897 in the mathematical tripos as 14th wrangler.

Edinburgh gave Johnston the degree of Doctor of Science.

Career
After leaving Cambridge, in 1898 Johnston was appointed as "professor" of physics at the Royal Agricultural College, Cirencester, but stayed for only one year. In 1899 he joined Tonbridge School as an assistant schoolmaster. He remained there until 1908, when he was appointed as headmaster at Highgate School.

At Highgate, Johnston found a school in which the focus was on classical education. Under his headship, science fifth and sixth forms were created, in which the main subjects were chemistry, physics, biology, and astronomy. Although the school had laboratories, Johnston considered them primitive and for many years pressed the school governors for better ones. Finally, in July 1928, came the opening of a new Science Building by Sir Samuel Hoare, Secretary of State for Air. 

Johnston next introduced aeronautics as a school subject. He acquired a Sopwith Snipe aeroplane and five engines for it, and an Avro 504K biplane, which was housed in a hangar on top of the new Science Building, for the boys to work on.

Johnston stayed at Highgate as head until he retired in 1936. He died in London in June 1938.

Personal life
In 1904, while teaching at Tonbridge, Johnston married Kate Winsome	Gammon. Their children included a son, Kenneth, born in 1906, and daughters Kathleen and Dorothy.
Their younger son John Alexander Hope Johnston became a pilot officer in the Royal Air Force and was killed on 18 April 1941, aged 27, on active service during the Second World War.

In Who's Who, Johnston's recreations were stated as golf and croquet.

After Johnston's death in 1938, his widow survived him until 1965.

Notes

1871 births
1938 deaths
Academics of the Royal Agricultural University
Alumni of the University of Edinburgh
Alumni of Pembroke College, Cambridge
Headmasters of Highgate School
Headmasters of Tonbridge School